Jasmine tea ( or ) is tea scented with the aroma of jasmine blossoms. Typically, jasmine tea has green tea as the tea base; however, white tea and black tea are also used. The resulting flavour of jasmine tea is subtly sweet and highly fragrant. It is the most famous scented tea in China.

The jasmine plant is believed to have been introduced into China from eastern South Asia via India during the Han Dynasty (206 BC to 220 AD), and was being used to scent tea around the fifth century. However, jasmine tea did not become widespread until the Qing Dynasty (1644 to 1912 AD), when tea started to be exported in large quantities to the West. Nowadays, it's still a common drink served in tea shops around the world.

The jasmine plant is grown at high elevations in the mountains. Jasmine tea produced in the Chinese province of Fujian has the best reputation. Jasmine tea is also produced in the provinces of Hunan, Jiangsu, Jiangxi, Guangdong, Guangxi, and Zhejiang. Japan is also known for the production of jasmine tea, especially in Okinawa Prefecture, where it is called .

Preparation
Tea leaves are harvested in the early spring and stored until the late summer when fresh jasmine flowers are in bloom. Jasmine flowers are picked early in the day when the small petals are tightly closed. The flowers are kept cool until nightfall. During the night, jasmine flowers open, releasing their fragrance. This is when the tea scenting takes place. There are two main methods used to scent the tea with the jasmine. In one method the tea and flowers are placed in alternating layers; in the other, the tea is blended with jasmine flowers and stored overnight. It takes over four hours for the tea to absorb the fragrance and flavour of the jasmine blossoms. The scenting process may be repeated as many as six or seven times for top grades such as Yin Hao. The tea absorbs moisture from the fresh Jasmine flowers so it must be dried again to prevent spoilage.

Cultural uses 

In southern China, it is customary to serve Jasmine tea as a welcoming gesture to guests. Jasmine tea is the local tea beverage of Fuzhou, while jasmine flowers are its municipal flower.

Jasmine has symbolic meanings in the Chinese culture. For example, the crown of the Buddhist in the Ajanta wall paintings, a world heritage site, is decorated by golden jasmine flowers. The fragrance of jasmines is thought to be of heaven. In the past, people in Fuzhou considered tea as an antidote to many poisons. In the Fuzhou dialect, the word for buying medicine literally means buying tea; brewing medicine, brewing tea; taking medicine, drinking tea. In addition, tea culture is important by shaping the art of drinking tea which follows different steps.

Fuzhou jasmine tea 
Fuzhou, the capital city of Fujian, is the most important city in producing jasmine tea in China.
The city is built at a river basin and surrounded by mountains. The climate in Fuzhou is mild, rainfall is abundant and the day-night temperature difference is obvious, creating favorable conditions for jasmine flowers to grow. According to the China Daily newspaper, "Fuzhou has 1,200 hectares of tea gardens and [in 2011] it produced 110,000 tons of jasmine tea, worth 1.78 billion yuan."

After the jasmine plant was introduced into Fuzhou, people planted the flower broadly. Between 960 and 1127 AD (during the Song Dynasty), Fuzhou gained the name of "The City of Jasmine in China". Fuzhou is regarded as the origin of the jasmine tea production process, and so far it is the only city to contain the complete production process. The jasmine tea making process began during the Tang Dynasty but changed substantially during the Ming Dynasty. Prior to 1937, the development of Fuzhou jasmine tea was fast and products were sold to many regions. With the outbreak of the Second Sino-Japanese War, output dropped quickly. From the 1950s through the 1990s, the jasmine tea industry revived and reached 60% of the total national production, but subsequently fell again.

The Chinese government is still working on reviving Fuzhou jasmine tea. In recent years, the Fuzhou Municipal Party Committee and government strove to protect and develop the system of Fuzhou jasmine planting and tea culture, and took active measures to cultivate good stock and applied for the heritage list[which one?].

The Food and Agriculture Organization of the United Nations recognized the "Fuzhou jasmine tea and tea culture system" as a "Globally Important Agricultural Heritage System". Experts from the Food and Agriculture Organization of the United Nations went to Fuzhou to inspect the process on April 5, 2014, after which, it was awarded the "Globally Important Agricultural Heritage System" title in Rome, Italy, on April 29, 2014.

See also 
Jasmine species commonly used as an ingredient for jasmine tea:
Jasminum officinale - the Common Jasmine
Jasminum sambac - the Sampaguita
 List of Chinese teas

References

Blended tea
Chinese teas
Chinese tea grown in Fujian